On 15 June 2021, a suicide bombing occurred in Mogadishu, Somalia. It happened at the General Dhegobadan Military Camp, where the bomber killed 15 army recruits. He was in a queue of recruits, pretending to be one of them.

Al-Shabaab, the Somali/East African branch of al-Qaeda, claimed responsibility for the bombing. It was the deadliest attack in the Somali capital since December 2019, when an al-Shabaab truck bombing at a police checkpoint killed 85 people and wounded 140 others.

References

External links

2021 murders in Somalia
June 2021 bombing
21st-century mass murder in Somalia
June 2021 bombing
Attacks on military installations
June 2021 crimes in Africa
Mass murder in 2021
June 2021 bombing
Somali Civil War (2009–present)
Suicide bombings in 2021
June 2021
Terrorist incidents in Somalia in 2021